NCTS may refer to:

 NASCAR Canadian Tire Series, former name of the NASCAR Pinty's Series
 NASCAR Craftsman Truck Series, former name of the Camping World Truck Series
 National Center for Theoretical Sciences
 Northern Cheyenne Tribal School